She and Me is a 1952 French comedy film directed by Guy Lefranc from a screenplay by Michel Audiard and , based on Duché's 1952 novel Elle et lui. It stars François Périer and Dany Robin, with Jacqueline Gauthier, Jean Carmet and Noël Roquevert. The film's sets were designed by art director Robert Clavel.

Cast
 François Périer as Jean Montaigu
 Dany Robin as Juliette Capulet
 Jean Carmet as Gaston, Jean's friend
 Jacqueline Gauthier as Irène Duval (nicknamed "Biquette")
 Noël Roquevert as Mr Belhomme, the eccentric owner
 Paul Faivre as Jean's uncle
  as Marie, Jean's aunt
 Michel Nastorg as Juliette's father
  as Juliette's mother
 Louis de Funès as café waiter
  as mayor
 Geneviève Morel as tobacconist

References

External links
 
 She and Me at the Films de France

1952 films
1952 comedy films
1950s French-language films
Films directed by Guy Lefranc
Films based on French novels
Films with screenplays by Michel Audiard
French black-and-white films
French comedy films
1950s French films